Michael Davis (born August 13, 1961) is a jazz trombonist from San Jose, California.

Biography

Trombonist/composer Michael Davis has enjoyed a diverse career over the past 35 years.

Discography

As leader
 1989 Sidewalk Cafe
 1991 Heroes
 1994 Midnight Crossing
 1997 Absolute Trombone
 1999 Bonetown
 2000 Brass Nation
 2002 New Brass
 2003 Trumpets Eleven
 2007 Absolute Trombone II
 2015 Bone Alone
 2016 Hip-Bone Big Band

As sideman
With Linda Eder
 1991 Linda Eder
 1997 It's Time
 2003 Broadway My Way

With Bob Mintzer
 1990 The Art of the Big Band
 1991 Departure
 1993 Only in New York
 2000 Homage to Count Basie
 2003 Gently
 2004 Live at MCG
 2006 Old School New Lessons
 2008 Swing Out
 2012 For the Moment

With The Rolling Stones
 1995 Stripped
 1998 No Security
 2008 Shine a Light

With Philippe Saisse
 1995 Masques
 1997 Next Voyage
 1999 Halfway Till Dawn
 2009 Philippe Saisse

With Andy Snitzer
 1994 Ties That Bind
 1996 In the Eye of the Storm
 1999 Some Quiet Place
 2013 The Rhythm

With others
 1985 Mr. Drums, Buddy Rich
 1989 Through the Storm, Aretha Franklin
 1991 All of Me, John Pizzarelli
 1993 Caché, Kirk Whalum
 1994 Just for You, Gladys Knight
 1994 Live from New York, Louie Bellson
 1994 Picture Perfect Morning, Edie Brickell
 1994 Push, Bill Evans
 1995 I Wish It So, Dawn Upshaw
 1996 Better Than Ever, Julius La Rosa
 1996 I'll Be Your Baby Tonight, Bernadette Peters
 1997 Que Pasa, Gato Barbieri
 1997 Turning Night into Day, Nelson Rangell
 1998 The Globe Sessions, Sheryl Crow
 1999 Slowing Down the World, Chris Botti
 2000 The Door, Keb' Mo'
 2000 Universal Language, Marc Antoine
 2001 Alternate Side, Tim Ries
 2002 Outbreak, Dennis Chambers
 2003 34th N Lex, Randy Brecker
 2003 Smile, Lyle Lovett
 2004 Taking a Chance on Love, Jane Monheit
 2005 When I'm With You, Chuck Loeb
 2007 This Is Somewhere, Grace Potter
 2008 The Rolling Stones Project, Tim Ries
 2014 No Sad Songs for Me, Carol Fredette
 2015 Before This World, James Taylor
 2015 The Hope of Christmas, Ann Hampton Callaway

References

External links
Hip-bone music

American jazz trombonists
Male trombonists
Living people
1961 births
Eastman School of Music alumni
Jazz musicians from San Francisco
21st-century trombonists
21st-century American male musicians
American male jazz musicians